Adam Lam (born September 11, 1987) is an Israeli footballer

He is the son of Benyamin Lam.

References

External links
Profile at One
 

1987 births
Living people
Israeli Jews
Israeli footballers
Israeli beach soccer players
Maccabi Netanya F.C. players
Hapoel Hadera F.C. players
Hapoel Kfar Shalem F.C. players
Maccabi Ironi Kfar Yona F.C. players
Maccabi Sha'arayim F.C. players
F.C. Givat Olga players
Hapoel Beit She'an F.C. players
Hapoel Pardesiya F.C. players
Footballers from Netanya
Israeli Premier League players
Association football defenders